Veronika Aleksandrovna Korsunova (born April 20, 1992) is a Russian freestyle skier specializing in aerials. She won a silver medal at the 2013 FIS Freestyle World Ski Championships.

References

External links
 FIS-Ski.com Profile

1992 births
Living people
Russian female freestyle skiers
Freestyle skiers at the 2014 Winter Olympics
Olympic freestyle skiers of Russia